Henry Okon Archibong  (born 1 January 1967) is a Nigerian politician. Henry Archibong currently represents Itu/Ibiono Ibom Federal Constituency in the Nigerian National Assembly.

References 

Living people
1967 births
Akwa Ibom State politicians
Peoples Democratic Party (Nigeria) politicians